Tanasha Donna Oketch (born 7 July 1995) is a Kenyan model, singer, entrepreneur & former radio presenter for NRG radio.

Biography
Personal life

Tanasha Donna was born in the United Kingdom on 7 July 1995 to a Kenyan mother and an Italian Father. Donna spent her childhood years in Kenya before moving to Belgium when she was 11 years old to live with her Belgian step-father. She gained great interest in fashion, music and modelling while in Belgium.

Donna made a return to Kenya and participate in Miss World Kenya. While in Kenya, she joined the NRG Radio as a presenter but quit to focus on her music career and motherhood.

In 2022, Donna has made her acting debut, in the 'Symphony' movie that was released on 9 September.

Relationships

Donna's public relationship was when she dated a Kenyan actor Nick Mutuma at a time she still was a commercial model. Mutuma and Donna broke up on August 2017, after seven months of dating.

In 2018, she dated a Tanzanian singer and businessman Diamond Platnumz. Donna and Diamond Platnumz, established a strong relationship. In 2019, they had a son named Naseeb Junior. Their relationship gave birth to Donna's music career after they collaborated in a hit song 'Gere'.

In 2020, Donna and Diamond Platnumz broke up, accusing one another as the reason for the breakup without making a clear reason for their break-up.

Since her break up with Diamond Platnumz in 2020, Donna has since not revealed her relationship status on public.

Awards and nominations

Discography

Extended Playlist (EP)
2020:Donatella
Singles
La Vie ft Mbosso
Ride ft Khaligraph Jones
Te amo

Other singles
2020
Gere ft Diamond Platnumz
Na wewe ft Avec Toi
Sawa
Donatella
Kalypso ft Khaligraph Jones

2021
Mood
Complications ft Bad Boy Timz
2022
Karma ft Barak Jacuzzi
Maradona

References

External links

 

1995 births
Living people
21st-century Kenyan women singers
Women songwriters
Kenyan radio presenters
Kenyan models